For a complete list see :Category:Football clubs in Turkey.

This is a list of association football clubs in Turkey. Clubs currently in the first three tiers of the Turkish football league system are listed alphabetically.

Alphabetical team listing

TFF Third League

 Group 1: 1877 Alemdağspor, Arnavutköy Belediyespor, Artvin Hopaspor, Belediye Derincespor, Bucaspor 1928, Çankaya FK, Diyarbakırspor, Edirnespor, Fatsa Belediyespor, Kemerspor 2003, Kızılcabölükspor, Malatya Yeşilyurt Belediyespor, Manisaspor, Nevşehir Belediyespor, Ofspor, Payasspor
 Group 2: Ağrı 1970 SK, Belediye Kütahyaspor, Büyükçekmece Tepecikspor, Çengelköy SK, Ceyhanspor, Darıca Gençlerbirliği, Fethiyespor, Halide Edip Adıvar SK, İskenderun FK, Kahta 02 Spor, Karaman FK, Mardin Fosfatspor, Nazilli Belediyespor, Tekirdağspor, Tokatspor, Yomraspor, Yozgatspor 1959 FK
 Group 3: Altındağspor, Arhavispor, Batman Petrolspor, Çarşambaspor, Çatalcaspor, Cizrespor, Elazığ Karakoçan, Erbaaspor, Esenler Erokspor, Gölcükspor, Isparta 32 Spor, İçel İdmanyurdu, Karşıyaka, Osmaniyespor FK, Somaspor, Şile Yıldızspor, Yalovaspor
 Group 4: 1954 Kelkit Belediyespor, 52 Orduspor, 68 Aksaray Belediyespor, Adıyaman 1954 SK, Alanya Kestelspor, Bayrampaşa, Bergama Belediyespor, Bursa Yıldırımspor, Düzcespor, Karaköprü Belediyespor, Kırıkkale Büyük Anadoluspor, Kozanspor, Modafen, Muğlaspor, Siirt İl Özel İdaresispor, Silivrispor, Sultanbeyli Belediyespor

Regional and Amateur Clubs

See also
 List of women's football clubs in Turkey

References 

 
Turkey
clubs
Football clubs